The sixth season of the American television medical drama Grey's Anatomy, commenced airing on the American Broadcasting Company (ABC) in the United States on September 24, 2009, and concluded on May 20, 2010. The season was produced by ABC Studios, in association with Shondaland Production Company and The Mark Gordon Company; the showrunner being Shonda Rhimes and head writer Krista Vernoff. Actors Ellen Pompeo, Sandra Oh, Katherine Heigl, and Justin Chambers reprised their roles as surgical residents Meredith Grey, Cristina Yang, Izzie Stevens, and Alex Karev, respectively. Heigl was released from her contract in the middle of the season, while T. R. Knight did not appear as George O'Malley, because Knight was released from his contract at the conclusion of season five. Main cast members Patrick Dempsey, Chandra Wilson, James Pickens, Jr., Sara Ramirez, Eric Dane, Chyler Leigh, and Kevin McKidd also returned, while previous recurring-star Jessica Capshaw was promoted to a series-regular, and Kim Raver was given star-billing after the commencement of the season.

The season follows the story of surgical interns, residents and their competent mentors, as they experience the difficulties of the competitive careers they have chosen. It is set in the surgical wing of the fictional Seattle Grace Hospital, located in Seattle, Washington. A major storyline of the season is the characters adapting to change, as their beloved co-worker Stevens departed following the breakdown of her marriage, O'Malley died in the season premiere—following his being dragged by a bus, and new cardiothoracic surgeon Teddy Altman is given employment at the hospital. Further storylines include Shepherd being promoted to chief of surgery, Seattle Grace Hospital merging with the neighboring Mercy West —introducing several new doctors, and several physicians lives being placed into danger—when a grieving deceased patient's husband embarks on a shooting spree at the hospital, seeking revenge for his wife's death. 

The series ended its sixth season with 13.26 million viewers, ranking #17 in terms of ratings, the lowest the series had ever ranked up to then. The season received mixed-to-positive critical feedback, with the season's premiere and finale given heavier critical acclaim, in contrast to the middle. The season was one of the least acclaimed in terms of awards and nominations, being the show's only season not to warrant a Primetime Emmy nomination. Despite the polarizing aspects of ratings and awards, the season managed to receive a spot on Movieline top 10 list. Buena Vista released the season onto a DVD box-set, being made available to regions 1 and 2.

Episodes 

The number in the "No. overall" column refers to the episode's number within the overall series, whereas the number in the "No. in season" column refers to the episode's number within this particular season. "U.S. viewers in millions" is the number of Americans in millions who watched the episodes live. The sixth season's episodes are altogether 1032 minutes in length. Each episode of this season is named after a song.

Cast and characters

Main 
 Ellen Pompeo as Dr. Meredith Grey
 Sandra Oh as Dr. Cristina Yang
 Katherine Heigl as Dr. Izzie Stevens
 Justin Chambers as Dr. Alex Karev
 Chandra Wilson as Dr. Miranda Bailey
 James Pickens Jr. as Dr. Richard Webber
 Sara Ramirez as Dr. Callie Torres
 Eric Dane as Dr. Mark Sloan
 Chyler Leigh as Dr. Lexie Grey
 Kevin McKidd as Dr. Owen Hunt
 Jessica Capshaw as Dr. Arizona Robbins
 Kim Raver as Dr. Teddy Altman
 Patrick Dempsey as Dr. Derek Shepherd

Recurring 
 Kate Walsh as Dr. Addison Montgomery
 Sarah Drew as Dr. April Kepner
 Jesse Williams as Dr. Jackson Avery
 Jason George as Dr. Ben Warren
 Nora Zehetner as Dr. Reed Adamson
 Robert Baker as Dr. Charles Percy
 Leven Rambin as Sloan Riley
 Jeff Perry as Thatcher Grey

Notable guests 
 Demi Lovato as Hayley
 Sara Gilbert as Kim Allen
 Marion Ross as Betty
 Mandy Moore as Mary Portman
 Ryan Devlin as Bill Portman
 Nick Purcell as Doug
 Michael O'Neill as Gary Clark
 Danielle Panabaker as Kelsey
 Adrienne Barbeau as Jodie Crawley
 Héctor Elizondo as Carlos Torres
 Cody Christian as Brad Walker
 Mark Saul as Dr. Steve Mostow
 Martha Plimpton as Pam Michaelson
 Loretta Devine as Adele Webber
 Debra Monk as Louise O'Malley
 Mitch Pileggi as 	Larry Jennings
 Courtney Ford as Jill Meyer
 David Ramsey as Jimmy Thompson
 Nicole Cummins as Paramedic Nicole 
 Frankie Faison as William Bailey
 Brandon Scott as Dr. Ryan Spalding
 Sarah Utterback as Olivia Harper
 Steven W. Bailey as Joe, the Bartender
 J. August Richards as Young Richard Webber 
 Sarah Paulson as Young Ellis Grey
 Emily Bergl as Trisha
 Amy Madigan as Dr. Katherine Wyatt
 Missi Pyle as Jasmine

Production

Development and writing 

The season was produced by Touchstone Television ABC Studios, The Mark Gordon Company, Shondaland and was distributed by Buena Vista International, Inc. The executive producers were creator Shonda Rhimes, Betsy Beers, Mark Gordon, Krista Vernoff, Rob Corn, Mark Wilding, Joan Rater and James D. Parriott. The regular directors were Shonda Rhimes, Krista Vernoff, Stacy McKee, William Harper, Debora Cahn, Allan Heinberg and Peter Nowalk. At the conclusion of season 5, T. R. Knight was released from his contract, following a disagreement with Rhimes. When asked to make a 'flashback' appearance in season six, Knight declined. Heigl's appearances in the season were sporadic, seeing Stevens depart and return twice. Although she was scheduled to appear in the final 5 episodes of the season, Heigl requested that she be released from her contract 18 months early, and made her final appearance on January 21, 2010. Heigl explained that she wanted to spend more time with her family, and did not think it would be respectful to Grey's Anatomy viewers to have Izzie return and depart yet again. The season's 2-hour opener showed the doctors of Seattle Grace Hospital, grieving the loss of their deceased friend, O'Malley. The special's writer, Vernoff, commented: "It's heartbreaking. I fell in love with George, like many of you did, in season one."

The ninth episode of the season, "New History", saw the arrival of Altman, which ended up forming a love-triangle between her, Hunt, and Yang. Raver commented on this: "She was in Iraq with Owen. She's a cardiac surgeon. She's really good at what she does. There'll be some interesting stuff between Teddy, Owen and Cristina." The episode's writer, Heinberg, offered his insight: 

"I Like You So Much Better When You're Naked" saw the departure of Stevens, following the breakdown of her marriage with Karev. Series' writer Joan Rater commented on this: "Izzie getting the clean scan back gives Alex the freedom to leave. Because he never would have left her when she was sick, he's a good guy. And I'm not saying that Alex ever consciously thought, I can’t leave her while she's sick, but now that she's not, now that she seems like she's going to get better, it just comes to him. He deserves more. He's a good guy and he deserves more. But loving Izzie showed him that he can be good, is good. So it was a little gift. And when he tells Izzie he's done, he's not bitter or angry, he's just done." The writing of the 2-part season 6 finale, caused struggle to Rhimes. She elaborated on this:

Casting 
The sixth season had 13 roles receiving star-billing, with 12 of them returning from the previous season, 1 of whom previously in a recurring guest capacity. The regulars portray the surgeons from the fictional Seattle Grace Hospital as new rivalries and romantic relationships begin to develop after the hospital's merger with Mercy West. Meredith Grey, a surgical resident and the protagonist of the series, is portrayed by Ellen Pompeo. Fellow third-year residents Cristina Yang, Izzie Stevens and Alex Karev are portrayed by Sandra Oh, Katherine Heigl and Justin Chambers, respectively. Attending general surgeon Miranda Bailey was portrayed by Chandra Wilson whose main storylines throughout the season focus on her divorce and the development of new romantic relationships. Seattle Grace Hospital's Chief of Surgery and general surgeon Richard Webber was portrayed by James Pickens, Jr., who returns to alcoholism after being sober for 20 years. 

Sara Ramirez acted as bisexual orthopedic surgeon Callie Torres, Eric Dane played womanizer plastic surgeon Mark Sloan, Chyler Leigh portrayed Meredith's half-sister and second-year surgical resident Lexie Grey, Kevin McKidd appeared as trauma surgeon Owen Hunt, and Patrick Dempsey featured as chief of neurosurgery Derek Shepherd. After having previously appeared in a multi-episode arc in a guest-star capacity in the show's fifth season, Jessica Capshaw began receiving star-billing in the season's premiere episode in the role of attending pediatric surgeon Arizona Robbins. The ninth episode of the season marked the introduction of the new chief of cardiothoracic surgery Teddy Altman, portrayed by Kim Raver, whose mysterious romantic past with Hunt develops into one of the season's main stories. Starting with the nineteenth episode of the season, Raver began receiving star-billing. 

The sixth season introduces several new recurring characters who start to develop progressive and expansive storylines throughout the season. Mercy West surgical residents Reed Adamson, Charles Percy, April Kepner and Jackson Avery were portrayed by Nora Zehetner, Robert Baker, Sarah Drew and Jesse Williams, respectively. Jason George portrayed Miranda Bailey's love-interest, anesthesiologist Ben Warren. Thatcher Grey (Jeff Perry) and Sloan Riley (Leven Rambin) have been part of the season's main story arcs, while numerous episodic characters have made guest appearances: Demi Lovato as Hayley, Sara Gilbert as Kim Allen, Marion Ross as Betty, Mandy Moore as Mary Portman, Ryan Devlin as Bill Portman, Nick Purcell as Doug, Michael O'Neill as Gary Clark, Danielle Panabaker as Kelsey, Adrienne Barbeau as Jodie Crawley, Héctor Elizondo as Mr. Torres, Cody Christian as Brad Walker, Amy Madigan as Dr. Wyatt, and Missi Pyle as Jasmine. Former series-regular Kate Walsh returned to the series as a special guest-star, portraying neonatal surgeon and obstetrician-gynecologist Addison Montgomery.

Reception

Ratings 

The sixth season opened up to 17.04 million viewers with a 6.7/17 Nielsen rating/share in the 18–49 demographic. Although the rating was a 1% decrease from season five's opener, it managed to rank first for its time-slot and the entire night, in terms of both ratings and viewership, and served as the season's most viewed episode. "Sympathy for the Parents" was the season's least viewed episode, and up to that point, the series' as well, garnering only 9.87 million viewers. The season's finale garnered 16.13 million viewers, and received a 6.2/18 rating, ranking first for its time-slot and the entire night, in terms of both ratings and viewership. Although the finale was a success for the night, it was a 1% decrease from season five's finale, but served as the season's second most viewed episode. Overall, the season ranked at #17 for the year, and had an average of 13.26 million viewers, a 5% decrease from the previous season's ranking.

Critical response 

The season received mixed-to-positive reviews among television critics. Speaking of the premiere, Glenn Diaz of BuddyTV noted that the special foreshadowed a "very dark" season, adding: "The talk between George's mom and one of the surgeons [Torres] proved to be one of the more heart-breaking scenes in an episode that in itself is heartbreaking enough." In contrast, Kelly West of TV Blend was critical of the premiere, writing: "I don’t think based on the first episode that we can say that Grey's is headed in a new direction, nor do I think the writers are making much of an effort to bring the series back to the greatness that was its earlier seasons. That said, this is Grey's Anatomy and with that comes the usual drama, sex, love and whacky medical mysteries thrown in the mix to keep things moving. If that's what you’re looking for, I think you’ll enjoy the season premiere just fine." Capshaw's performance this season was praised, with The TV Addict calling her "immensely likeable". Although "Sympathy for the Parents" was the least viewed episode, TV Fanatic called the episode "touching", praising Chambers' performance. TV Fanatics reaction to the season was fairly mixed, with Steve Marsi saying that Grey's Anatomy was facing an identity crisis after viewing "Give Peace a Chance". He said that: "Still popular but lacking its past magic, it's trying to decide what to become. All we can say is that if it becomes what we saw 12 hours ago, we are all for it. Last week saw the doctors plunging into ER-style chaos with 12 different doctors giving 12 different accounts of one case. Last night, we saw something else equally unusual." He praised Patrick Dempsey's performance, saying: "Again, it was a single case that took up the entire hour, but instead of 12 doctors' version of events, the focus was largely on just one, and the best one: Dr. Derek Shepherd. Patrick Dempsey's McDreamy character may be eye candy, but he's got substance. Last night's episode proved that in spades, and was one of the series' best in some time."

The season's finale Death And All His Friends was highly praised. Marsi gave the episode five stars, and expressed that it may have been the best episode of the series, adding: "The writing and acting were absolutely stellar, and may lead to many Emmy nominations, but even more impressively, despite a killing spree, it remained distinctly Grey's. Some of the back-and-forths between the characters were truly memorable, and some of the developments so heartbreaking that we don't even know where to begin now. Seriously, the Season 6 finale left us laying awake afterward thinking about everything, a feeling we haven't had from Grey's in years and rarely achieved by any program." John Kubicek of BuddyTV also noted that the finale was the best episode, adding: "[It was] two of the best hours of television all year. It was certainly the best Grey's Anatomy has ever been, which is saying a lot since I'd written the show off for the past few years. No show does a big traumatic event like Grey's Anatomy, and the shooter gave the show license for heightened drama with five major characters being shot over the two hours. It was emotional, expertly paced and had me in tears for most of the finale." Entertainment Weekly wrote, "At any rate, now you can at least see where it all began. And while you’re still pondering how Grey's can still be so damn good sometimes,"

 Accolades 

The season was one of the least acclaimed of the series, in terms of awards and nominations. Despite not being nominated for a Primetime Emmy, the show received two Creative Arts Emmy Awards: Outstanding Prosthetic Makeup For A Series, Miniseries, Movie Or A Special for "How Insensitive" and Outstanding Makeup For A Single-Camera Series (Non-Prosthetic) for "Suicide is Painless". The season also received a nomination for Outstanding Drama Series at the GLAAD Media Awards. Wilson was awarded the NAACP Image Award for Outstanding Directing in a Dramatic Series for her directing in "Give Peace a Chance". The season also ranked at #10 on Movieline top ten list.

 DVD release 

 References SpecificGeneral'

 
 
 
 

2009 American television seasons
2010 American television seasons

Grey's Anatomy seasons